Silla Q'asa (Quechua silla gravel, q'asa mountain pass, "gravel pass", also spelled Silla Khasa) is a mountain in the Bolivian Andes which reaches a height of approximately . It is located in the Cochabamba Department, Ayopaya Province, Morochata Municipality. It lies southeast and east of the lakes named Q'umir Qucha ("green lake", Khomer Khocha), Yana Qucha ("black lake", Yana Khocha), Parinani ("the one with flamingos") and  Wallatani ("the one with Andean geese", Huallatani).

References 

Mountains of Cochabamba Department